Jutta Abromeit ( Raeck, born 17 September 1959) is a retired East German rower who won a world title in the coxed four in 1985, together with Kerstin Spittler, Carola Lichey, Steffi Götzelt and Daniela Neunast. In October 1986, she was awarded a Patriotic Order of Merit in gold (first class) for her sporting success.

References

1959 births
Living people
People from Ludwigsfelde
People from Bezirk Potsdam
East German female rowers
Sportspeople from Brandenburg
World Rowing Championships medalists for East Germany
Recipients of the Patriotic Order of Merit in gold